The A85 is a major road in Scotland.  It runs east from Oban along the south bank of Loch Etive, through Lochawe and Tyndrum, Crianlarich, Lochearnhead, St Fillans and Crieff before passing through Perth, where it crosses the River Tay via Perth Bridge to Bridgend. Its name between Crieff and Perth is the Crieff Road.  It then multiplexes with the A90 to the Swallow Roundabout before diverging to follow the Invergowrie Bypass, Riverside Avenue and Riverside Drive before terminating in Dundee city centre.

The A90 road from Perth to Dundee was previously numbered A85; on opening of an upgraded A94 to Aberdeen the A90 number was continued across the Friarton Bridge (previously M85) and on to the A85 route, then from Swallow Roundabout to Aberdeen.  The Perth-Dundee stretch was formerly part of the Euroroute system, of route E120 which ran in a circular route between Inverness, Aberdeen, Dundee and Perth.

Between Tyndrum and Crianlarich the road multiplexes with the A82, where it merges with the main north–south road. Parts follow an old military road.

Some statistics seem to show that the stretch of the A85 between Oban and Tyndrum is among the ten most dangerous roads in Scotland.

Gallery

References

External links

Roads in Scotland
Scenic routes in the United Kingdom
Transport in Argyll and Bute
Transport in Stirling (council area)
Transport in Perth and Kinross
Transport in Dundee